The following table displays the ranks of the Volunteer Police Cadets, St John Ambulance Cadets and Fire Cadets. This table is based on equivalent Rank Structures within the Cadet Forces as detailed in regulations of the SCC, RMC, and the Air Cadets.

Cadet ranks
Cadets wear the issued cadet rank slides. The titles of most ranks in other Cadet Forces, such as the Army Cadet Force and the Sea Cadet Corps, usually follows equivalent ranks in the UK military. However due to the lack of ranks in the UK services the UK Cadet Services has created ranks and insignia.

Although promotion is based on merit rather than progression through the training syllabuses, certain criteria must be met before a cadet is eligible for promotion:

See also

Cadet Forces
Combined Cadet Force
Community Cadet Forces
Air Training Corps
Army Cadet Force
Sea Cadet Corps
Volunteer Cadet Corps
Royal Marines Volunteer Cadet Corps

Ranks of the British Services
Police ranks of the United Kingdom

References